The golden pheasant (Chrysolophus pictus), also known as the Chinese pheasant, and rainbow pheasant, is a gamebird of the order Galliformes (gallinaceous birds) and the family Phasianidae (pheasants). The genus name is from Ancient Greek khrusolophos, "with golden crest", and pictus is Latin for "painted" from pingere, "to paint".

Description
It is native to forests in mountainous areas of western China, but feral populations have been established in the United Kingdom, Canada, the United States, Mexico, Colombia, Peru, Bolivia, Chile, Argentina, Uruguay, the Falkland Islands, Germany, Belgium, the Netherlands, France, Ireland, Australia and New Zealand. In England they may be found in East Anglia in the dense forest landscape of the Breckland as well as Tresco on the Isles of Scilly.

It is unmistakable with its golden crest and rump and bright red body. The deep orange "cape" can be spread in display, appearing as an alternating black and orange fan that covers all of the face except its bright yellow eye with a pinpoint black pupil. The male is around 500–700g in weight.

Males have a golden-yellow crest with a hint of red at the tip. The face, throat, chin, and the sides of neck are rusty tan. The wattles and orbital skin are both yellow in colour, and the ruff or cape is light orange. The upper back is green and the rest of the back and rump is golden-yellow. The tertiaries are blue whereas the scapulars are dark red. Other characteristics of the male plumage are the central tail feathers, black spotted with cinnamon, as well as the tip of the tail being a cinnamon buff. The upper tail coverts are the same colour as the central tail feathers. The male also has a scarlet breast, and scarlet and light chestnut flanks and underparts. Lower legs and feet are a dull yellow.

The female (hen) is much less showy, with a duller mottled brown plumage similar to that of the female common pheasant. She is darker and more slender than the hen of that species, with a proportionately shorter tail (half her  length). The female's breast and sides are barred buff and blackish brown, and the abdomen is plain buff. She has a buff face and throat. Some abnormal females may later in their lifetime get some male plumage. Lower legs and feet are a dull yellow.

Both males and females have yellow legs and yellow bills.

They feed on the ground on grain, leaves and invertebrates, but they roost in trees at night. During winter, flocks tend to forage close to human settlements at the edge of forest, taking primarily wheat leaves and seeds. While they can fly clumsily in short bursts, they prefer to run and spend most of their time on the ground. This type of flying is commonly known as "flapping flight" and is due to a lack of a deep layer of M. pectoralis pars thoracicus and the tendon that attaches to it. This muscle is commonly attributed to the stabilization of flight in other birds; however, the absence of this deep layer causes this mode of "flapping flight" is simply a mechanism that it shares with other ground birds in order to escape predators. However, they would rather prefer to simply run away and hide from their predators rather than to fly. If startled, they can suddenly burst upwards at great speed and with a distinctive wing sound.

Golden pheasants lay 8 to 12 eggs at a time and will then incubate these for around 22–23 days. They tend to eat berries, grubs, seeds and other types of vegetation.

The male has a metallic call in the breeding season.

The golden pheasant is commonly found in zoos and aviaries, but often as hybrid specimens that have the similar Lady Amherst's pheasant in their lineage.

There are also different mutations of the golden pheasant known from birds in captivity, including the dark-throated, yellow, cinnamon, salmon, peach, splash, mahogany and silver. In aviculture, the wild type is referred to as "red-golden" to differentiate it from these mutations.

The coloration in the feathers can be an indication to the genetic quality of the male golden pheasant. hue, brightness, and chroma are usually measured to see color differences. results show that heterozygosity of the most polymorphic major histocompatibility complex locus was highly related with the chroma and brightness of the feathers.

Gallery

See also

List of endangered and protected species of China

References

golden pheasant
Birds of Central China
Endemic birds of China
golden pheasant
golden pheasant